Nigel Reginald Pullman JP (born 1947) is a former British Army officer and newspaper executive. In 2012–13, he was one of the two Sheriffs of the City of London.

Biography 
Pullman was educated at Sherborne School before going to the Royal Military Academy Sandhurst. He was commissioned into the Royal Corps of Signals in 1968, serving with the Brigade of Gurkhas and the United Nations in Cyprus (1974–75). He was promoted to the rank of captain before leaving regular military service. He then joined the Inns of Court & City Yeomanry (Territorial Army), retiring in 1988. In 2016, he was appointed Honorary Colonel of 68 (Inns of Court & City Yeomanry) Signal Squadron and of the Band of The Royal Yeomanry (Inns of Court and City Yeomanry). He was appointed to Her Majesty's Commission of Lieutenancy for the City of London in 2014.

After the army, Pullman worked for the Financial Times (1979–96) before becoming clerk to the Worshipful Company of World Traders (1997–2008). He was Master of the Leathersellers' Company for 2010–11 and Sheriff of the City of London in 2012–13. In retirement, he was chairman of the City of London Livery Committee (2013–16), a governor of Colfe's School in Lewisham (2002–16), and is clerk of the City & Metropolitan Welfare Charities, as well as a number of other voluntary roles in the charity and livery world.

Honours and decorations
  UN Cyprus Medal

Arms

References

External links 
 Pullman's personal website
 Leathersellers' Company website
 World Traders' Company website
 Press release on the City of London website

1947 births
Living people
People educated at Sherborne School
Royal Corps of Signals officers
Sheriffs of the City of London
20th-century British Army personnel